Peter Nicholas Kanis (13 April 1931 – 25 November 2021) was an Australian rules footballer who played with Hawthorn in the Victorian Football League (VFL) and Norwood in the South Australian National Football League (SANFL).

Family
The son of Constantine Kanis (1898-1983), and Asimina Kanis (1902-1968), née Amonis, Peter Kanis was born on 13 April 1931.

Education
He attended Melbourne High School, and was the captain of the school's First XVIII.

Hawthorn (VFL)
The VFL established a competition known as the Victorian Junior Football League in 1919; it was renamed "the Seconds" in 1924 (i.e., the clubs' Second XVIIIs), and "the Reserves" in 1960. In between 1946 and 1959 the VFL conducted a "Thirds" competition (i.e., the clubs' Third XVIIIs), it was renamed "the Under-19s" in 1960. One of the important advantages of a "Thirds" team was seen to be that it "enable[d] players to move from team to team without the necessity of obtaining a clearance to rise from Third to Second Eighteen or vice versa".

Although some sources indicate that Kanis came to Hawthorn via the Melbourne High School Old Boys Football Club (MHSOB) in the Victorian Amateur Football Association (VAFA), others indicate, more strongly, that he had risen through the Hawthorn system from playing with the "Thirds", to playing with the "Seconds". and, as well the fact that he was listed, by the MHSOB, as one of the "former AFL/VFL players who started their football at MHS and/or MHSOBFC", suggests that the "or" applies in his case, and that he was recruited while still a student at Melbourne High School.

In his last match for the Hawthorn club he was the captain of the team that played in the 1956 (Seconds') first semi-final, against Richmond, at the MCG on 25 August 1956 — the Hawthorn Club's first-ever appearance in a VFL final in any grade — and, although Hawthorn lost the match, 5.9 (39) to 9.12 (66), Kanis was one of the Hawthorn Seconds' best players.

Notes

References
 Peter Kanis, Redlegs Museum: History of the Norwood Football Club.
 Gordon, Harry, "Migrant Sports Stars Among Our Top-Liners", The Good Neighbour, No.45, (October 1957), Department of Immigration, (Canberra), pp.4-5: the article includes a photograph of Peter Kanis, the captain of a team from Melbourne's Olympic Club, that played an Australian Rules Football match, in Melbourne, against a team from Perth's Hellenic Club (alongside the Hellenic Club's captain, Nick Gelavis).]

External links 
 
 
 Peter Kanis: Boyles Football Photos.
 Peter Kanis, at Redlegs Museum.

1931 births
2021 deaths
Australian rules footballers from Victoria (Australia)
Australian people of Greek descent	
Hawthorn Football Club players
Norwood Football Club players
People educated at Melbourne High School